Potrero (Spanish for "Pasture") is a census-designated place in the Mountain Empire area of southeastern San Diego County, California.

Location
State Route 94 connects Potrero by road west to San Diego and east to Campo.  Potrero is Spanish for 'pasture land'. Its closest neighbor is Tecate, in Mexico.

Geography
According to the United States Census Bureau, the CDP covers an area of 3.1 square miles (8.2 km), all of it land.

Demographics
At the 2010 census Potrero had a population of 656. The racial makeup of Potrero was 338 (51.5%) White, 0 (0.0%) African American, 8 (1.2%) Native American, 0 (0.0%) Asian, 3 (0.5%) Pacific Islander, 281 (42.8%) from other races, and 26 (4.0%) from two or more races. Hispanic or Latino of any race were 499 people (76.1%).

The whole population lived in households, no one lived in non-institutionalized group quarters and no one was institutionalized.

There were 189 households, 92 (48.7%) had children under the age of 18 living in them, 95 (50.3%) were opposite-sex married couples living together, 31 (16.4%) had a female householder with no husband present, 9 (4.8%) had a male householder with no wife present.  There were 18 (9.5%) unmarried opposite-sex partnerships, and 0 (0%) same-sex married couples or partnerships. Thirty-seven households (19.6%) were one person and 17 (9.0%) had someone living alone who was 65 or older. The average household size was 3.47.  There were 135 families (71.4% of households); the average family size was 4.11.

The age distribution was 217 people (33.1%) under the age of 18, 60 people (9.1%) aged 18 to 24, 155 people (23.6%) aged 25 to 44, 156 people (23.8%) aged 45 to 64, and 68 people (10.4%) who were 65 or older.  The median age was 32.4 years. For every 100 females, there were 103.1 males.  For every 100 females age 18 and over, there were 97.7 males.

There were 208 housing units at an average density of 66.1 per square mile, of the occupied units 113 (59.8%) were owner-occupied and 76 (40.2%) were rented. The homeowner vacancy rate was 5.0%; the rental vacancy rate was 1.3%. Of the population 379 people (57.8%) lived in owner-occupied housing units and 277 people (42.2%) lived in rental housing units.

Blackwater controversy
In 2007, Blackwater USA submitted plans to build a weapons training facility in Potrero. The plans generated substantial controversy in the community.

Local activists organized a recall campaign against the members of the local planning group. On 11 December 2007, all five members of the Potrero Community Planning Group who approved the Blackwater project lost their seats in a recall election. On March 7, 2008, Blackwater USA pulled their application for this facility.

References
Specific

General

 
 

Census-designated places in California
Census-designated places in San Diego County, California
Mountain Empire (San Diego County)